California's Gold is a public television human interest program that explores the natural, cultural, and historical features of California. The series ran for 24 seasons beginning in 1991, and was produced and hosted by Huell Howser in collaboration with KCET, Los Angeles. The series ceased production when Howser retired in November 2012, shortly before his death on January 7, 2013, although episodes continue to be shown on KCET and are featured on the page at the station's website about his shows.

The series theme song is "California, Here I Come." Typically, it is performed by local musicians who may be from a given episode's locale.  However some episodes include an old-time recording of the California state song "I Love You, California".

Production

The minimal production allowed locations and people to remain the focal point of the program.  
Howser's archives are now housed at Chapman University in Orange, California, and can be streamed online.  The decision to donate them grew out his experiences making an episode of the show.

Episodes
California's Gold is divided into 24 seasons of varying lengths (plus specials), comprising 443 episodes.

In May 2016, KCET showed a "lost" episode on the Charles F. Lummis House, now considered to be the final episode. In March 2018, documentary filmmaker John McDonald released an unofficial episode of the series. "California's Gold: The Ghost Mountain Experiment" documents the life of California hermit Marshal South and family, and incorporates previously unreleased footage produced by Howser.

Related shows
Several related shows were also produced by Huell Howser Productions in collaboration with KCET. These were California's Green, a show about environmentally friendly measures being undertaken in California; California's Golden Coast; California's Golden Parks; California's Water; California's Missions; Road Trip, a show about sights along California's highways and byways; Downtown, a show about Los Angeles' downtown; Visiting..., a show about sights in the Los Angeles area; and Palm Springs.

References

External links
 Huell Howser Archives at Chapman University
 California's Gold
 Video Podcast Feed – California's Gold
 
 California's Gold episodes available free on iTunes
 California Gold History

1990s American television series
2012 American television series endings